Aswardby (pronounced "as-ard-bee") is a village situated  north-west from Spilsby, in the East Lindsey district of Lincolnshire, England. It lies north of the A158 and west of the A16 roads. It is in the civil parish of Sausthorpe.

Fr T. Pelham Dale, SSC, prosecuted and imprisoned for Ritualist practices in 1876 and 1880, and regarded a martyr by Anglo-Catholics, was the parish priest from 1881 to 1892.

Aswardby Hall was built approximately 1845, with further building works completed around 1910.

See also
 Roger de Aswardby, 14th-century Master of University College, Oxford

References

External links

Villages in Lincolnshire
Civil parishes in Lincolnshire
East Lindsey District